

Election results
1937 Japanese general election
1936 Japanese general election
1932 Japanese general election
1930 Japanese general election
1928 Japanese general election

History of Hokkaido
Politics of Hokkaido